was a Japanese poet of the early 8th century.

He was a contemporary of Yamabe no Akahito, Yamanoue no Okura and Ōtomo no Tabito, and was known for his poems on travel and a collection of local myths and legends. Little is known about his life.  He was a low-ranking court official serving in Nara and in some northeastern provinces.

His poetry is well represented in Man'yōshū: the poems numbered 321, 971, 972, 1497, 1738 through 1760, 1780, 1781, and 1807 through 1811 are attributed to him.

Notes

Japanese male poets
8th-century Japanese poets